Gmina Abramów is a rural gmina (administrative district) in Lubartów County, Lublin Voivodeship, in eastern Poland.

Neighbouring gminas
Gmina Abramów is bordered by the gminas of Baranów, Garbów, Kamionka, Kurów, Markuszów, Michów, and Żyrzyn.

Villages
The gmina contains the villages of Abramów, Ciotcza, Dębiny, Glinnik, Izabelmont, Marcinów, Michałówka, Sosnówka, Wielkie, Wielkolas, and Wolica.

References

External links
Polish official population figures 2006
The old website (archived)

Abramow
Lubartów County